Amnirana darlingi, commonly known as Darling's golden-backed frog, is a species of frogs in the family Ranidae. It is found in eastern Angola, the Caprivi Strip of Namibia, extreme northern Botswana, extreme southern Democratic Republic of the Congo, Zambia (but for the northeast), eastern and northern Zimbabwe, southern Malawi, and west-central Mozambique.

Its natural habitats are subtropical or tropical dry forests, subtropical or tropical moist lowland forests, moist savanna, subtropical or tropical moist shrubland, subtropical or tropical seasonally wet or flooded lowland grassland, rivers, swamps, freshwater lakes, freshwater marshes, arable land, pastureland, water storage areas, and ponds.

Conservation
Significant pressures are present from an expanding human population of the region, particularly due to conversion of habitat to agriculture, extraction of river water for human consumption, and widespread slash-and-burn practises. According to C. Michael Hogan: "While the population for H. darlingi may be secure for the present, the threat accretion trends place a significant pressure upon the habitat itself, as well as the fragmentation of habitat."

References

 C.Michael Hogan. 2012. Hylarana darlingi. African Amphibians Lifedesk. ed. Breda Zimkus 

darlingi
Frogs of Africa
Amphibians of Angola
Amphibians of Botswana
Amphibians of the Democratic Republic of the Congo
Amphibians of Malawi
Amphibians of Mozambique
Amphibians of Namibia
Amphibians of Zambia
Amphibians of Zimbabwe
Amphibians described in 1902
Taxa named by George Albert Boulenger
Taxonomy articles created by Polbot